Patrocles (active  312 – 270 BCE) was a Greek and specifically a Macedonian general and writer on geographical subjects.

He served Seleucus and Antiochus for several decades. After exploring the Caspian Sea, Patrocles concluded that the Caspian was a gulf or inlet that could be entered from the Indian Ocean. The only information on his work (even the title is unknown) is documented in the work of Strabo. As a military officer, Patrocles was a skilled engineer, and at one point managed to defend Babylonia for Seleucus against Demetrius Poliorcetes by flooding the irrigation canals.

After the death of Seleucus, Patrocles was sent by his successor Antiochus to put down a revolt in Asia Minor. However, his forces were defeated there in an engagement with the Bithynians.

See also
 Demodamas
 Megasthenes

References
 
 The Edges of the Earth in Ancient Thought: Geography, Exploration, and Fiction Page 97 By James S. Romm 

4th-century BC births
3rd-century BC deaths
Ancient Macedonian generals
Ancient Greek geographers
Seleucid generals
Ancient Greek explorers
Ancient Macedonian geographers
Explorers of Asia
History of the Caspian Sea
3rd-century BC geographers